Ashot ibn Abu'l-Aswar Shavur ibn Fadl was a Shaddadid prince, the second son of Abu'l-Aswar Shavur ibn Fadl. During the captivity of his older brother Fadl ibn Shavur by the Georgians in 1068, he ruled in his stead as emir of Arran for eight months (August 1068 – April 1069), even minting coins in his own name and that of his overlord, the Seljuk Sultan Alp Arslan.

References

Sources
 
 

Emirs of Ganja
Shaddadids
11th-century rulers in Asia
11th-century Kurdish people